Bagré (or Bagré-Village) is a village and seat of the Bagré Department of Boulgou Province in south-eastern Burkina Faso. As of 2012, the village has a population of 4,993.

References

Populated places in the Centre-Est Region
Boulgou Province